Cameron Mitchell may refer to:

 Cameron Mitchell (actor) (1918–1994), American actor
 Cameron Mitchell (singer) (born 1989), American singer-songwriter
 Cameron Mitchell (Stargate), a fictional character in the series Stargate SG-1

See also
 Cameron Mitchell Restaurants, a restaurant company headquartered in Columbus, Ohio
 John Cameron Mitchell (born 1963), American actor, playwright, screenwriter, and director